The 2016 Volta Limburg Classic was the 43rd edition of the Volta Limburg Classic cycle race and was held on 2 April 2016. The race started and finished in Eijsden. The race was won by Floris Gerts.

General classification

References

2016
2016 in road cycling
2016 in Dutch sport